Giovanni Tebaldini (Brescia, September 7, 1864 – San Benedetto del Tronto May 11, 1952) was an Italian composer, organist and musicologist.

Life 
He studied with Amilcare Ponchielli at the Conservatory of Milan and later with 
Franz Xaver Haberl in Regensburg. He was maestro di cappella in several Italian cities and later director of the Conservatory of Parma and director of Santa Casa di Loreto.

Compositions

Organ solo 
Trois Pièces d’Orgue (1896)

Theoretical works 
Metodo di studio per l’Organo moderno (1894)

Writings 
La musica sacra in Italia (1893) 
L’archivio musicale della Cappella antoniana in Padova (1895)
La musica sacra nella storia e nella liturgia (1904)

Sources 
Horwath, Michael (1970). Tebaldini, Gnecchi and Strauss. (in Italian).
Pilati, Mario (1929). "Giovanni Tebaldini ". Bollettino bibliografico musicale. (in Italian).
Untersteiner, Alfredo (1895). Giovanni Tebaldini e la riforma della musica da chiesa. (in Italian).

References

External links 
 

1864 births
1952 deaths
20th-century classical composers
20th-century Italian composers
20th-century Italian male musicians
Composers for pipe organ
Italian classical composers
Italian male classical composers
Italian classical organists
Italian musicologists
Male classical organists
Milan Conservatory alumni
People from Brescia